CEV may stand for:

Medical
Closed-eye visualization,  a class of hallucination
Clinically extremely vulnerable, an NHS category for those at high risk from a COVID-19 infection

Religion
Contemporary English Version, a translation of the Bible into English 1995
Venezuelan Episcopal Conference, a Venezuelan Catholic archdiocesan organization

Vehicles
Crew Exploration Vehicle, NASA's proposed human spaceflight system, now known as Orion
Combat engineering vehicle, armoured vehicles supporting battlefield engineering works
M728 combat engineer vehicle, a combat engineer vehicle  mounted on a tank chassis

Other
European Volleyball Confederation (French: Confédération européenne de volleyball), the continental European volleyball governing body
Certified Video Engineer, a professional title regulated by the Society of Broadcast Engineers
Chemins de fer électriques Veveysans, a Swiss railway company
Cochrane Eyes and Vision, a collaboration of researchers and healthcare professionals
Coherent Extrapolated Volition, an approach to friendly artificial intelligence
Constant elasticity of variance model, a pricing model
Equivalent carbon content, also called "carbon equivalent value", a property of alloy steels
Centre d'essais en vol, a flight testing centre in Brétigny-sur-Orge, France
European Volunteer Centre